Ding Yi may refer to:

People
 Ding Yi (Han dynasty) (died 220), official under the Han dynasty warlord Cao Cao
 Ding Yi (businessman) (1927–2019), founder of Dongfang Electric Corporation
 Ding Yi (admiral) (born 1959), deputy commander of the PLA Navy
 Ding Yi (table tennis) (born 1959), Chinese-born Austrian table tennis player
 Yi Ding (actress) (born 1983), Chinese-born American actress
 Ding Yi (actress) (1942–2000), winner of the best supporting actress award at the 5th Golden Rooster Awards
 Ding Yi (artist) (born 1962), Chinese contemporary artist
 Ding Yi, fictional physicist, protagonist of Ball Lightning and minor character in Remembrance of Earth's Past
 Ding Yi, protagonist in Shi Tiesheng's novel My Sojourn in Ding Yi

Other uses
 Ding Yi Music Company